The Province of Modena is a province in the Emilia-Romagna region of Italy. Its capital is the city of Modena.

There are 48 comuni (singular: comune) in the province, see Comuni of the Province of Modena. The largest after Modena are Carpi, Sassuolo, Formigine and Castelfranco Emilia.

Economy
Modena is one of the most important industrial areas in Europe. It is widely considered as the capital of the supercar and sports car industry, lodging the Ferrari, Maserati, De Tomaso and Pagani car manufacturers, is home to international food industries like Grandi Salumifici, Cremonini Group, Fini Group, and several pottery manufacturers, textile firms, and pharmaceutical companies.

References

External links
 Official website  

 
Modena